Enterprise Hotel, also known as Gasthaus Alt Heidelberg, is a historic hotel building located at Lafayette, Tippecanoe County, Indiana.  It was built in 1895, and is a three-story, five bay, rectangular, Italianate style brick building, with rear additions.  It measures 42 feet wide and 32 feet deep.  It is historically significant as a European style tavern / inn.

It was listed on the National Register of Historic Places in 1984.

References

Hotel buildings on the National Register of Historic Places in Indiana
Italianate architecture in Indiana
Hotel buildings completed in 1895
Buildings and structures in Lafayette, Indiana
National Register of Historic Places in Tippecanoe County, Indiana